Club Basket Bilbao Berri S.A.D., commonly known as Bilbao Basket, also known as Surne Bilbao Basket for sponsorship reasons, is a professional basketball club based in Bilbao, Spain. The team plays in the Liga ACB. Their home arena is the Bilbao Arena, Spain.

History 
The club was founded in 2000 after replacing the former city clubs: Cajabilbao and SD Patronato. After four seasons between LEB and LEB 2, Bilbao promoted to Liga ACB in 2004 by winning by 3–1 to Baloncesto León in the LEB semifinals.

Bilbao spent ten seasons in the top tier of the Spanish basketball becoming finalist of the league in the 2010–11 season, where it lost in the finals to FC Barcelona by 3–0. In 2012, Bilbao played the EuroLeague and it was eliminated in the quarterfinals by CSKA Moscow, who won the series by 3–1.

The best era of the club finished in 2013, when it lost the 2013 Eurocup Final at Charleroi against Lokomotiv Kuban.

On 17 July 2014, the ACB excluded Bilbao Basket from the Liga ACB due to its financial trouble, but on 8 August, the Association was forced to retire the exclusion and finally Bilbao Basket remained in the Spanish top league.

The club played four more seasons in Liga ACB until their relegation on 13 May 2018, after losing against Baskonia the Basque derby by 74–78.

Sponsorship naming 
Bilbao Basket has had several denominations through the years due to its sponsorship:

Lagun Aro Bilbao Basket: 2004–07
iurbentia Bilbao Basket: 2007–09
Bizkaia Bilbao Basket: 2009–11
Gescrap Bizkaia Bilbao Basket: 2011–12
Uxúe Bilbao Basket: 2012–13
Dominion Bilbao Basket: 2015–16
RETAbet Bilbao Basket: 2016–21
Surne Bilbao Basket: 2021–present

Logos

Home arenas 
Pabellón La Casilla: (2000–09)
Bizkaia Arena: (2009–10), occasionally used for home games in 2007 and 2008
Bilbao Arena: (2010–present)

Players

Retired numbers

Current roster

Depth chart

Head coaches 

Txutxo Sanz: 2000–2001
Pedro Zorrozua: 2001
Txus Vidorreta: 2001–2010
Rafa Pueyo: 2010, 2013–2014
Fotis Katsikaris: 2010–2013
Sito Alonso: 2014–2016
Carles Duran: 2016–2017
Veljko Mršić: 2017–2018
Jaka Lakovič: 2018
Álex Mumbrú: 2018–2022
Jaume Ponsarnau: 2022–present

Season by season

Trophies and awards

Trophies 
Liga ACB:
Runners-up (1): 2011
Supercopa de España:
Runners-up (1): 2007
 EuroCup Basketball:
Runners-up (1): 2013
LEB Oro: (1)
2004
Copa Princesa de Asturias:
Runners-up (2): 2002, 2019
LEB Plata: (1)
2002
Copa LEB Plata: (1)
2002

Individual awards 
All-ACB First Team
Marcelo Huertas – 2008
Marko Todorović – 2015
Álex Mumbrú – 2016
EuroCup MVP
Marko Banić – 2010
All-EuroCup First Team
Marko Banić – 2009, 2010
Kostas Vasileiadis – 2013
All-EuroCup Second Team
Lamont Hamilton – 2013
EuroCup Coach of the Year
Fotios Katsikaris – 2013

Notable players 

 Quino Colom
 Alberto Díaz
 Germán Gabriel
 Roger Grimau
 Eduardo Hernández-Sonseca
 Raül López
 Rafa Martínez
 Álex Mumbrú
 Javi Salgado
 Fran Vázquez
 Axel Hervelle
 Marcelinho Huertas
 Rafa Luz
 Tiago Splitter
 Marko Banić
 Damir Markota
 Ondřej Balvín
 Ángel Delgado
 Damien Inglis
 Adrien Moerman
 Jérôme Moïso
 Frédéric Weis
 Jaylon Brown
 D'or Fischer
 Andrew Goudelock
 Lamont Hamilton
 Aaron Jackson
 John Jenkins
 Quincy Lewis
 Khyri Thomas
 Jeff Withey
 Dairis Bertāns
 Jānis Blūms
 Antanas Kavaliauskas
 Arnoldas Kulboka
 Renaldas Seibutis
 Predrag Savović
 Marko Todorović
 Micheal Eric
 Georgios Bogris
 Dimitrios Mavroeidis
 Kostas Vasileiadis
 Nikos Zisis
 Martin Rančík
 Ludvig Håkanson

Matches against NBA teams

Rivalries 
Bilbao Basket has a strong rivalry with Saski Baskonia. Their games together are called the Basque basketball derby.

Fundación Bilbao Basket 
Fundación Bilbao Basket is the reserve team of Bilbao Basket. It currently plays in Primera División, the fifth tier of Spanish basketball.

Season by season

References

External links 
Official website 
Bilbao Basket at ACB.com 

 
Basque basketball teams
Basketball teams established in 2000
Liga ACB teams
Former LEB Oro teams
Former LEB Plata teams
2000 establishments in Spain
Sports teams in Bilbao